Nobodyknows (stylized as nobodyknows+) is a Japanese hip-hop band founded in 1999.

History
Nobodyknows debuted in 2003 on the Sony Music Associated Records label with the mini-album Nobody knows3.  They have released several hit CD singles which include "Kokoro Odoru", a song that was used as the second ending theme for the anime television series SD Gundam Force and included in the Nintendo DS game Osu! Tatakae! Ouendan. They released their first album, Do You Know?, in June 2004 and debuted at number one on the Japanese Oricon charts, a rare accomplishment for hip-hop groups in Japan. In 2005, the group wanted to help aspiring local artists, so they organized the Nagoya Music Expo in September. The event brought in around 10,000 people.

Later that year, Nobodyknows released their second album, titled 5MC&1DJ. The album featured the song "Shiawase Nara Te o Tatakō" which was used as the theme song for the Japanese release of Kung Fu Hustle. The group remained in the public eye in 2006 with a national tour in February as they performed in every prefecture in Japan, which had not been previously done before by a hip-hop group. The tour was filmed and released in November as a DVD and Blu-ray release titled Nobodyknows+ Tour 2006 "5MC&1DJ" - Kuribou no Menkui Dochu Hizakurige. The group performed their first overseas concert at Tokyo Night 2007 on 24 March in Long Beach, California, bringing their style of hip-hop/pop fusion to a U.S. audience.

Their single "Hero’s Come Back!!" was chosen as the first opening theme for the anime television series Naruto: Shippūden. On 10 February 2009, they released a new single called "Fallin'" which featured the original singer, Shigeru Matsuzaki (also known as Shigeru Brown) . In 2010, they left major label Onenation, and returned to their original indie label $Tax (pronounced "Dollar Tax") Records.

In 2011, member Nori da Funky Shibire-sasu started balancing his work at Nobodyknows with a career in professional wrestling. He wrestled occasionally and as a freelancer, mainly competing in Dramatic Dream Team and Ice Ribbon, though he became a usual member of Pro Wrestling Heat Up in 2017. His tenure there would be successful, winning the Shakunetsuo Battle League 2017 and taking the Heat Up Universal Championship from founder Kazuhiro Tamura. However, after losing the title to Daisuke Kanehira, he retired from professional wrestling in October 2018.

Members
 Hokuroman Han-rice (ホクロマン半ライス!!!) - Born 21 July 1979
 Crystal Boy (Crystal Boy) - Born 4 July 1977
 Yasu Ichiban? (ヤス一番) - Born 29 November 1978
 Nori da Funky Shibire-sasu (ノリ・ダ・ファンキーシビレサス) - Born 20 August 1980
 DJ Mitsu (DJ MITSU) - Born 12 March 1972

Former members
 G-ton - Born 22 January 1975

Notable dates
 1 October 1999: G-ton, DJ Mitsu, and Crystal Boy form nobody knows in Nagoya.
 1 January 2000: DJ Mitsu forms the independent record label $TAX Records, based out of his club LUSH in Nagoya.
 29 August 2000: The EP nobody knows is released.
 5 May 2001: The EP nobody knows2 is released, ranking 19th on Oricon Indies Chart.
 1 February 2002: Nobody knows signs a contract with record label Onenation.
 1 July 2002: Yasu Ichiban, HIDDEN FISH, and Nori da Funky Shibire-sasu publish the mini-album Omae wa Hirata Daro? under the band name Wakaba Juku, with DJ Mitsu as the band's DJ.
 1 June 2003: Finding it difficult to balance DJing for nobody knows and Wakaba Juku, DJ Mitsu consolidates Wakaba Juku into nobody knows and rebrands the band as nobodyknows+.
 1 April 2007: Nobodyknows member G-ton leaves the band.
 22 August 2007: Nobodyknows release their third full album, Vulgarhythm, two years after their second one.

Discography

Singles
 Nobody knows (EP) (2000)

 THEME FROM NOBODY KNOWS pt.1
 Seigitobishō
 Understan'?
 Sakura
Nobody knows 2 (EP) (28 April 2001)

 THEME FROM NOBODY KNOWS pt.2
 Zoku supīkā kara
 Nijūichi Seiki Kishu (feat. Seamonator, Garigari Mōja, Yasu Ichiban)
 Asa
 (EP) (10 August 2002) 
 intro
 Number One
 El Samurai
 Real Man
 ...! (Bonus Track)
Nobody knows3 (EP) (19 February 2003) 
 Nijūichi Seiki Kishu
 Ieie ~Erabete Aru Koto no Kōkotsu to Fuan to Futatsu Ware ni Ari~
 Theme from nobody knows pt.4
 Next Batter's Circle
 Sentimental Bus
 (EP) (27 August 2003) 
 intro
 Irai Zecchō
 Taiyo to Shōnen (feat. Dankan) 
 Theme from nobody knows pt.5 ~Yoromeki~
 (EP) (19 November 2003) 
 Susumidasu→
 innocent word
 Rash (feat. coba) 
 Theme from nobodyknows+ pt.6
 Enokorogusa ~coba_strumental~
 (25 February 2004) 
 Poron2
 Sakura Spring Field Version
 Poron2 -instrumental-
 Sakura Spring Field Version -instrumental-
 (26 May 2004) 
 Kokoro Odoru -original version-
 Theme from nobodyknows+ pt.7
 Ore la Ryū ~dreamin' day~
 Kokoro Odoru -instrumental version-
 (13 January 2005) 
 Shiawase Nara Te wo Tatakō
 Theme from nobodyknows+ pt.8
 T.R.U.E.
 (27 April 2005) 
 Theme from nobodyknows+ pt.10
 Mebae
 Magnum Ima Ike
 Mebae -instrumental-
 (6 July 2005) 
 El Mirador ~Tenbōdai no Uta~
 Theme from nobodyknows+ pt.11
 ＠ the same time
 El Mirador ~Tenbōdai no Uta~ -instrumental-
"Dō yo?" （どうよ？） (19 October 2005) 
 Dō yo?
 Theme from nobodyknows+ pt.12
 Natsu no Kakera
 Dō yo? -instrumental-
"Hero's Come Back!!" (25 April 2007) 
 Hero's Come Back!!
 Ca Latte
 Oh Happy Days
 Hero's Come Back!! -instrumental-

 "Under Rain feat. Primera" (9 April 2008)

 Under Rain feat. Primera
 Kininaruki
 I love Mary. (Spring Version) 
 Under Rain feat. Primera -instrumental-

 "Villain's Pain (Hero's Come Back!!～Other Side～) /Imaike Samba" (30 July 2008)

 Intro
 Villain's Pain (Hero's Come Back!!～Other Side～) 
 interlude
 Imaike Samba
 Villain's Pain (Hero's Come Back!!～Other Side～) -instrumental- 
 Imaike Samba -instrumental- 
"Fallin' feat. Shigeru Brown" (11 February 2009) 
"Fallin"
"Fallin" (Live at Imaike Open House in 1988)
"Fallin" -instrumental-

"Winds of Wins" (24 June 2010)

 Winds of Wins
 1-9(theme from No.41)
 Winds of Wins -instrumental-
 1-9(theme from No.41) -instrumental-
"Fly High" (12 April 2011)

 Fly High
 FOREVER
 Fly High -instrumental-
 FOREVER -instrumental-
"Join Us" (8 June 2012)

 Join Us
 MUST BE TRUE
 Join Us -instrumental-
 MUST BE TRUE -instrumental-
"Let's Dance" (29 March 2013)

 Let's Dance
 Join Us (Remix) (feat. SEAMO, KOOKAI, NAI, SAMON, with Yonesaki Junior High School
 Let's Dance -instrumental-
 Join Us (Remix) -instrumental-

Albums
Do You Know? (30 June 2004) 
5MC & 1DJ (2 November 2005) 
Vulgarhythm (22 August 2007) 
Best of nobodyknows+ (compilation album) (11 March 2009) 
nobodyknows+ is dead? (25 September 2013) 
THE FIVE WAYS (6 December 2017)

References

External links
  
 Official website on Sigma Sounds Studio
 J!-ENT article on nobodyknows+ performance at Tokyo Night 2007
 J!-ENT interviews nobodyknows+ - 2007

1999 establishments in Japan
Japanese pop music groups
Musical groups established in 1999
Musical groups from Aichi Prefecture
Sony Music Entertainment Japan artists
Japanese boy bands
Japanese hip hop groups